Mohsen "Milad" Fayyazbakhsh (born January 26, 1991, in Bushehr, Iran) is an Iranian football midfielder. He currently plays for Azadegan League club Iranjavan, as well as the Iran national under-22 football team.

Club career

Iranjavan
Fayyazbakhsh started his career at Iranjavan when he was 18 years old. During the 2011–12 Azadegan League he performed well and was invited to play on Iran U–22. In the summer of 2012 he was close to signing with Esteghlal, but finally decided to stay at Bushehr and extend his contract until 2014. As of winter 2013 he has had offers  to play for Fajr Sepasi, but he has stated that he will stay at Iranjavan until the end of the season.

Persepolis
On 2 June 2013, he joined the Persepolis preseason camp in Ardabil. However, he failed the technical tests and returned to Iranjavan after a few days.

Club career statistics

International career

Youth
He was called to play for the Iran national under-23 football team by Ali Reza Mansourian once in 2012.

References

External links
 Mohsen Fayyazbakhsh at PersianLeague

Iranian footballers
Living people
Iranjavan players
1991 births
Association football midfielders
People from Bushehr